Coscinodiscaceae is a diatom family in the order Coscinodiscales.

References

External links

Diatom families
Coscinodiscophyceae
Taxa named by Friedrich Traugott Kützing